Bolshoye is a rural locality (a selo) in Prokhorovsky District, Belgorod Oblast, Russia. The population was 343 as of 2010. There are 6 streets.

Geography 
Bolshoye is located 25 km southeast of Prokhorovka (the district's administrative centre) by road. Khmelevoye is the nearest rural locality. Bolshoye is 260 meters higher from sea level.

References 

Rural localities in Prokhorovsky District